"The Hounds of Anubis" is a song by The Word Alive. It was released as the second single from their debut studio album, Deceiver. The song is the opening track on the record and was written by the guitarists, Tony Pizzuti and Zack Hansen. Hansen scripted it as having an "Egyptian feel" wherein the song's title was also inspired from. The single premiered on the official Revolver website being met with positive reception prior to Deceivers release.

Background
"The Hounds of Anubis" was solely written by the two guitarists, Zack Hansen and Tony Pizzuti. It was explained that they "wrote this song with an "Egyptian" feel to it and I think we got our point across." The guitar solo for the song is performed by both Hansen and Pizzuti, who always alternate solos, and like "Battle Royale", it is played after the second verse and before the song's only breakdown.

Vocalist, Tyler Smith described that the theme of the song is about "myself and the rest of the band trying to overcome all of our obstacles and with the help of our fans, rallying together to create something amazing. In the song I am represented by the king, in the verses I am talking to anyone who stands against my kingdom, while the choruses are about those who believe in the king. In essence, our fans and supporters who believe in us."

A remix of the song was handled by Limp Bizkit guitarist Wes Borland in 2011 and was released on the deluxe edition of Deceiver.

Track listing

Personnel
The Word Alive
 Tyler Smith – lead vocals
 Zack Hansen – guitars, backing vocals
 Tony Pizzuti – guitars, backing vocals
 Nick Urlacher – bass
 Dusty Riach – keyboards, programming
 Justin Salinas – drums, percussion

Additional personnel
 Andrew Wade – production, mastering, mixing
 Matt Martone – additional engineering
 Alan Douches – mastering

References

2010 singles
Song recordings produced by Andrew Wade
The Word Alive songs
2010 songs
Fearless Records singles